Regina Apostolorum Academy is a private non-sectarian school located in Santa Mesa, Manila,.The school's name is named after their Queen of Apostles. The school was formerly known as Angelicum School. The director of the school is the Ms. Teresa Tuason and the principal is Ms. Janette Liwanag.

Elementary schools in Manila
High schools in Manila
Private schools in Manila
Education in Santa Mesa
Educational institutions established in 1996
1996 establishments in the Philippines